Wu Cheng or Wucheng may refer to:

People
Emperor Wucheng of Northern Qi (537–569), emperor of the Northern Qi dynasty
Wu Cheng (Wuyue) (893–965), chancellor of the Wuyue Kingdom
Wu Cheng (philosopher) (1249–1333), philosopher during the Song and Yuan dynasties

Places in China
Wucheng County, a county in Shandong
Wucheng District, a district in Jinhua, Zhejiang
Wucheng Township, Zhangshu, a township in Zhangshu, Jiangxi
Wucheng culture, Bronze Age culture in Wucheng Township, Zhangshu
Wucheng Township, Shanxi (吴城乡), a township in Hunyuan County, Shanxi
Wucheng Subdistrict (坞城街道), a subdistrict in Xiaodian District, Taiyuan, Shanxi

Towns
Wucheng, Wuwei County (无城), in Wuwei County, Anhui
Wucheng, Xiuning County (五城), in Xiuning County, Anhui
Wucheng, Tongbai County (吴城), in Tongbai County, Henan
Wucheng, Wuyang County (吴城), in Wuyang County, Henan
Wucheng, Jiangsu (吴城), in Huai'an, Jiangsu
Wucheng, Yongxiu County (吴城), in Yongxiu County, Jiangxi
Wucheng, Wucheng County (武城), seat of Wucheng County, Shandong
Wucheng, Xi County (午城), in Xi County, Shanxi
Wucheng, Lüliang, in Lüliang, Shanxi

Historical eras
Wucheng (武成, 559–560), era name used by Emperor Ming of Northern Zhou
Wucheng (武成, 784–786), era name used by Li Xilie
Wucheng (武成, 908–910), era name used by Wang Jian

See also
Wu Zheng (disambiguation)
Wuchang (disambiguation)